The Neuroradiology Journal  is a bimonthly peer-reviewed medical journal covering diagnostic neuroradiology. It was established in 1994 and is published by SAGE Publications.  The editor-in-chief is Waleed Brinjikji (Mayo Clinic).

Abstracting and indexing 
The journal is abstracted and indexed in:
 CINAHL Plus
 Embase
 Index Medicus//MEDLINE/PubMed
 Scopus
ESCI

References

External links 
 

Radiology and medical imaging journals
Neurology journals
Neuroradiology
Bimonthly journals
SAGE Publishing academic journals
English-language journals
Publications established in 1994